Huseyn Shaheed Suhrawardy (8 September 18925 December 1963) was a Bengali barrister and politician. He served as the Prime Minister of Pakistan from 1956 to 1957 and before that as the Prime Minister of Bengal from 1946 to 1947 in British India. In Pakistan, Suhrawardy is revered as one of the country's founding statesmen. In Bangladesh, Suhrawardy is remembered as the mentor of Bangladesh's founding leader Sheikh Mujibur Rahman. In India, he is seen as a controversial figure; some hold him responsible for the 1946 Calcutta Killings, for which he is often referred as the "Butcher of Bengal” in West Bengal. In India he is also remembered for his performance as the Minister for Civil Supply during the Bengal famine of 1943.

Suhrawardy was a scion of one of British Bengal's most prominent Muslim families, the Suhrawardy family. His father Sir Zahid Suhrawardy was a judge of the high court in Bengal. Suhrawardy studied law in Oxford. After returning to India, he joined the Indian independence movement during the 1920s as a trade union leader in Calcutta. He was initially associated with the Swaraj Party. He joined the All-India Muslim League and became one of the leaders of the Bengal Provincial Muslim League (BPML). Suhrawardy was elected to the Bengal Legislative Assembly in 1937. In 1946, Suhrawardy led the BPML to decisively win the provincial general election. He served as Bengal's last premier until the Partition of India. His premiership was notable for his proposal to create a Free State of Bengal and failing to prevent the Great Calcutta Killings. Muhammad Ali Jinnah, leader of the Muslim League, supported an independent Bengal; this was strongly opposed by the Congress Party. In 1947, the Bengal Assembly voted to partition the territory. Suhrawardy briefly remained in India after partition to attend to his ailing father and manage his family's property. He eventually moved to Pakistan and divided his time between Karachi (Pakistan's federal capital) and Dhaka (capital of East Pakistan).

In Dhaka, Suhrawardy emerged as the leader of the Bengali-dominated Awami League which became the principal opposition party to the Pakistan Muslim League. In 1956, the centre-left Awami League formed a coalition government with the military-backed Republican Party to unseat the Muslim League. Suhrawardy became Prime Minister in the coalition government. He forged stronger ties with the United States by leading Pakistan's diplomacy in SEATO and CENTO. He also became the first Pakistani premier to travel to Communist China. His pro-US foreign policy caused a split in the Awami League in East Pakistan, with Maulana Bhashani forming the break-away pro-Maoist National Awami Party. Suhrawardy's premiership lasted for a year. His central cabinet included figures like Sir Feroz Khan Noon as Foreign Minister and Abul Mansur Ahmad as Trade Minister. Sheikh Mujibur Rahman was considered Suhrawardy's chief political protégé.

Suhrawardy was premier under Pakistan's first republican constitution which ended dominion status and the monarchy of Queen Elizabeth. During the 1958 military coup, Suhrawardy was arrested by the martial law government. He missed the wedding of his niece, Salma Sobhan (Pakistan's first woman barrister), because of his detention. In 1963, Suhrawardy died in Beirut due to a heart attack. After his death, the Awami League veered towards Bengali nationalism, the 6-point movement, East Pakistani secession and ultimately Bangladeshi independence in 1971. According to Sheikh Mujibur Rahman, "Bengalis had initially failed to appreciate a leader of Mr. Suhrawardy's stature. By the time they learned to value him, they had run out of time". Suhrawardy's only daughter Begum Akhtar Sulaiman was a social worker and activist in Pakistan; his son, Rashid Suhrawardy, from his second marriage to Vera Alexandrovna Tiscenko Calder; was a British Bangladeshi actor known for his role in the film Jinnah. His brother Hasan Shaheed Suhrawardy was a diplomat, writer and art-critic. Many places in South Asia bear his name, including an avenue in Islamabad; a large park near his mausoleum in Dhaka; and streets, dormitories and memorials across Bangladesh. The Suhrawardy family home in modern-day Kolkata has been leased as a Library and Information Centre of the Bangladesh High Commission in India by the city's Waqf board.

Family and early life

The Suhrawardy family are regarded as one of the illustrious families of the Indian subcontinent. Claiming themselves as descendants of the first caliph of Islam, the Suhrawardy lineage is traced to Shihab al-Din 'Umar al-Suhrawardi, a Sufi who lived in Baghdad during the 12th century. The Suhrawardiyya order is one of the major Sunni orders of Sufism. His grandfather, Ubaidullah Al Ubaidi Suhrawardy, was a Dhaka-based Sufi leader of the Bengali Renaissance and buried beside the Lalbagh Fort. His father Justice Sir Zahid Suhrawardy was a Judge of the Calcutta High Court. His brother Hasan Shaheed Suhrawardy was a linguist, poet, art-critic and diplomat. His uncles included Lieutenant Colonel Hassan Suhrawardy and Sir Abdullah Al-Mamun Suhrawardy. His cousin Shaista Suhrawardy Ikramullah was one of South Asia's pioneering women in public service. His first wife was Begum Niaz Fatima, the daughter of Justice Sir Abdur Rahim, a member of the Governor's Executive Council and Speaker of the Central Legislative Assembly. Begum Niaz Fatima died in 1922. His second wife was Begum Veera Suhrawardy, a Russian actress of Polish descent.

A young Huseyn studied in Calcutta Madrasa and attended St. Xavier's College where he earned a Bachelor of Science degree. Both Huseyn and his elder brother Hasan studied in St Catherine's College, Oxford. They entertained themselves with D. H. Lawrence, Robert Trevelyn, Bertrand Russell, Hugh Kingsmill, Basanta Kumar Mullick, Kiran Shankar Roy, Apurba Chanda, Sri Prakash, S K Gupta, Surendra Kumar Sen, and Syud Hossain. The elder Suhrawardy (Hasan) was in Oxford when Bengali poet Rabindranath Tagore became the first Asian to win a Nobel Prize in 1913. His brother Hasan later recounted that "it is difficult now for me to recapture the elation and the ecstasy of those days, but I remember distinctly that look of awe which was in my landlady's eyes when she brought in the breakfast with the morning newspaper containing the scoop". Suhrawardy obtained further degrees, including a Bachelor of Civil Law from Oxford and a Master of Arts in Arabic from Calcutta. Suhrawardy became a barrister. He was called to the Bar of England and Wales through Gray's Inn in 1922–23.

His first son Shahab died of pneumonia. His second son Rashid Suhrawardy was a British theatre actor. Rashid starred in the film Jinnah along with Christopher Lee. His granddaughter Shahida Jamil served as Pakistan's law minister. His nieces include Princess Sarvath al-Hassan of the Hashemite Kingdom of Jordan; the late Bangladeshi barrister Salma Sobhan; and the film-maker Naz Ikramullah.

Political career

Political organizer
Suhrawardy was credited as a pioneering modern political organizer in Bengal. He created 36 trade unions among sailors, railway employees, jute and cotton mills workers, rickshaw pullers, cart drivers and other working class groups dominated by Bengali Muslims.

Deputy Mayor of Calcutta (1924-1926)
Suhrawardy joined the Swaraj Party led by Bengali Hindu secularist C. R. Das in 1923. He became the Deputy Mayor of Calcutta in 1924. After the death of Das, Suhrawardy turned to Indian Muslim nationalism. He emerged as a leader of the Bengal Provincial Muslim League (BPML), the provincial wing of the Muslim League which his father Zahid had earlier helped create in 1912.

Bengali Muslim groups
Suhrawardy formed several Bengali Muslim political groups, including the Calcutta Khilafat Committee during the 1920s amid the dissolution of the Ottoman caliphate and the Turkish War of Independence; the Bengal Muslim Election Board; the United Muslim Party; and the Independent Muslim Party.

Bengal Legislative Assembly and WWII
In 1937, Suhrawardy was elected to the newly formed Bengal Legislative Assembly. He was appointed as Minister of Commerce and Labor in the cabinet of the 1st Prime Minister of Bengal A. K. Fazlul Huq. In 1940, the Lahore Resolution was adopted by Indian Muslim leaders calling for the creation of independent states in eastern and northwestern India; it was unclear if the resolution implied a single state covering the two Muslim-majority regions of India or multiple states. Suhrawardy served as Minister of Civil Supplies in the cabinet of the 2nd Prime Minister of Bengal Sir Khawaja Nazimuddin. According to author Thomas Keneally, Suhrawardy blamed black marketers and the central government in New Delhi for the Bengal famine of 1943 during World War II, and claimed he worked tirelessly on relief. Viceroy Lord Wavell, however, believed that Suhrawardy was corrupt, that he "siphoned money from every project that was undertaken to ease the famine, and awarded to his associates contracts for warehousing, the sale of grain to governments, and transportation." On the other hand, Indian author, Madhushree Mukherjee, laid major responsibility of this famine to British Prime Minister Winston Churchill who wanted the ration for war efforts only and had refrained the U.S. aid to Bengal. Suhrawardy was further accused of practising a Scorched-Earth Policy to counter the Japanese Army's advances in the East and supervised to burn thousand fishing boats to block any potential movement of invading Japanese Army troops. These measures aggravated starvation and famine and the relief was only ordered when Lord Wavell became the Viceroy, using the Indian Army to organise relief. However, by that time, the winter crop had arrived and famine conditions had already eased, after millions had earlier perished. Calcutta's Hindu-owned newspapers had become very critical of his role and the Bengali Hindus held him directly responsible for the famine.

Prime Minister of Bengal (1946-1947)

During the 1946 general election, Suhrawardy led the Bengal Provincial Muslim League (BPML) to a decisive victory. The Muslim League's biggest success was in Bengal where out of 119 seats for Muslims, the BPML won 113. Suhrawardy was supported by the League's chief Muhammad Ali Jinnah to assume the premiership of Bengal. Suhrawardy's cabinet included himself as home minister; Mohammad Ali of Bogra as finance, health and local government minister; Syed Muazzemuddin Hossain as education minister; Ahmed Hossain as agriculture, forest and fisheries minister; Nagendra Nath Roy as judicial and legislative minister; Abul Fazal Muhammad Abdur Rahman as cooperatives and irrigation Minister; Abul Gofran as civil supplies minister; Tarak Nath Mukherjee as waterways minister; Fazlur Rahman as land minister; and Dwarka Nath Barury as works minister.

Direct Action riots

Suhrawardy's tenure as premier saw the Great Calcutta Killings in 1946. The Muslim League called a strike to press its demand for the creation of Pakistan. The strike degenerated into brutal and widespread Hindu-Muslim riots in which thousands were killed on both sides. The riots were seen by some as the last nail in the coffin for Hindu-Muslim unity in British India.

Troubles started on the morning of 16 August. Even before 10 o'clock Police Headquarters at Lalbazar had reported that there was excitement throughout the city, that shops were being forced to close, and that there were many reports of brawls, stabbing and throwing of stones and brickbats. These were mainly concentrated in the North-central parts of the city like Rajabazar, Kelabagan, College Street, Harrison Road, Colootolla and Burrabazar. In these areas the Hindus were in a majority and were also in a superior and powerful economic position. The trouble had assumed the communal character which it was to retain throughout. The League's rally began at Ochterlony Monument at noon exactly. The gathering was considered as the 'largest ever Muslim assembly in Bengal' at that time.

The meeting began around 2 pm though processions of Muslims from all parts of Calcutta had started assembling since the midday prayers. A large number of the participants were reported to have been armed with iron bars and lathis (bamboo sticks). The numbers attending were estimated by a Central Intelligence Officer's reporter at 30,000 and by a Special Branch Inspector of Calcutta Police at 500,000. The latter figure is impossibly high and the Star of India reporter put it at about 100,000. The main speakers were Sir Khawaja Nazimuddin and Chief Minister Huseyn Shaheed Suhrawardy. Khwaja Nazimuddin in his speech preached peacefulness and restraint but spoilt the effect and flared up the tensions by stating that till 11 o'clock that morning all the injured persons were Muslims, and the Muslim community had only retaliated in self-defence.

The Special Branch of Calcutta Police had sent only one shorthand reporter to the meeting, with the result that no transcript of the Chief Minister's speech is available. But the Central Intelligence Officer and a reporter, who Frederick Burrows believed was reliable, deputed by the military authorities agree on one statement (not reported at all by the Calcutta Police). The version in the former's report was—"He [the Chief Minister] had seen to police and military arrangements who would not interfere". The version of the latter's was—"He had been able to restrain the military and the police". However, the police did not receive any specific order to "hold back". So, whatever Suhrawardy may have meant to convey by this, the impression of such a statement on a largely uneducated audience is construed by some to be an open invitation to disorder indeed, many of the listeners are reported to have started attacking Hindus and looting Hindu shops as soon as they left the meeting. Subsequently, there were reports of lorries (trucks) that came down Harrison Road in Calcutta, carrying hardline Muslim gangsters armed with brickbats and bottles as weapons and attacking Hindu-owned shops.

A 6 pm curfew was imposed in the parts of the city where there had been rioting. At 8 pm forces were deployed to secure main routes and conduct patrols from those arteries, thereby freeing up police for work in the slums and the other underdeveloped sections.

United Bengal

In New Delhi on 27 April 1946, Suhrawardy called a press conference to demand an undivided, independent Bengal. Suhrawardy made an impassioned plea for setting aside religious differences in order to create an "independent, undivided, and sovereign Bengal". He opposed the British government's plan to partition India's most populous province; he was supported by the Governor of Bengal Frederick Burrows, Sarat Chandra Bose of the Indian National Congress, Kiran Shankar Roy of the Congress Parliamentary Party, Satya Ranjan Bakshi, Secretary of the Bengal Provincial Muslim League Abul Hashim, Bengal Finance Minister Mohammad Ali Chaudhury, Bengal Revenue Minister Fazlur Rahman and Tippera politician Ashrafuddin Chowdhury. Suhrawardy stated the following:-

On 20 May 1947, a five-point plan was outlined for a "Free State of Bengal", echoing the legacy of the name of the Irish Free State. The plan was based on a confessionalist structure with power-sharing between Hindus and Muslims. It mirrored some of the confessionalist practices adopted in French Lebanon in 1926, where the positions of President and Prime Minister rotated among Muslims and Christians. The five-point plan stated that "On the announcement by His Majesty's Government that the proposal of the Free State of Bengal had been accepted and that Bengal would not be partitioned, the present Bengal Ministry would be dissolved. A new interim Ministry would be brought into being, consisting of an equal number of Muslims and Hindus (including Scheduled Caste Hindus) but excluding the Prime Minister. In this Ministry, the Prime Minister would be a Muslim and the Home Minister a Hindu. Pending the final emergence of a Legislature and a Ministry under the new constitutions, Hindus (including Scheduled Caste Hindus) and Muslims would have an equal share in the Services, including military and police. The Services would be manned by Bengalis. A Constituent Assembly composed of 30 persons, 16 Muslims and 14 non-Muslims, would be elected by Muslim and non-Muslim members of the Legislature respectively, excluding Europeans". The British government seriously considered of the option of an independent Bengal. British commercial interests in Bengal required safeguards. The United States was also briefed on the possibility of three countries emerging out of partition, including Pakistan, India, and Bengal. On 2 June 1947, British Prime Minister Clement Attlee informed the US Ambassador to the United Kingdom Lewis Williams Douglas that there was a "distinct possibility Bengal might decide against partition and against joining either Hindustan or Pakistan". Douglas cabled the State Department about the matter.

Partition of India

On 20 June 1947, the Bengal Legislative Assembly met to vote on the partition of Bengal. At the preliminary joint session, the assembly decided by 120 votes to 90 that it should remain united if it joined the Constituent Assembly of Pakistan. Later, a separate meeting of legislators from West Bengal decided by 58 votes to 21 that the province should be partitioned and that West Bengal should join the Constituent Assembly of India. In another separate meeting of legislators from East Bengal, it was decided by 106 votes to 35 that the province should not be partitioned and 107 votes to 34 that East Bengal should join Pakistan in the event of partition. Communal violence broke out across India, especially in the Punjab and Bengal's Noakhali district. Suhrawardy traveled to Noakhali with Mahatma Gandhi to restore order; Gandhi and Suhrawardy also had deliberations in Calcutta. After the transfer of power on 14–15 August 1947, Suhrawardy continued to remain in India for a few years where he attended to ailing members of his family. He eventually settled down in the Dominion of Pakistan, with residences in the federal capital Karachi and the provincial capital Dhaka. His cousin Begum Shaista Suhrawardy Ikramullah called for Pakistan's constituent assembly to convene in Dacca as East Bengal was home to the majority of Pakistan's population.

Awami League
Suhrawardy joined the Awami League, a party formed in 1949 to counter the erstwhile ruling Muslim League. Suhrawardy emerged as the centrist leader of the Awami League; while Maulana Bhashani represented more radical leftist factions. The Awami League was often allied with the centre-left Krishak Praja Party of A. K. Fazlul Huq. Suhrawardy's chief protégé in East Bengal was Sheikh Mujibur Rahman, to whom Suhrawardy delegated political responsibilities.

Law Minister of Pakistan
Suhrawardy was appointed law minister in 1953 in the cabinet of Prime Minister Mohammad Ali Bogra. He was in charge of drafting Pakistan's constitution.

United Front

One of the highlights of Suhrawardy's political career was leading the United Front campaign during the 1954 East Bengali election which booted the Muslim League out of power.

Leader of the Opposition
At the federal level, Suhrawardy served as Leader of the Opposition in the parliament of Pakistan in 1955. His position was bolstered by the landslide victory in East Bengal in 1954.

Prime Minister of Pakistan (1956-1957)

In 1956, the Awami League formed a coalition with Pakistan's Republican Party to unseat the previous government. Suhrawardy became the fifth Prime Minister of Pakistan and the second premier under the 1956 Constitution of Pakistan. Suhrawardy was known as a pro-American politician. He also cultivated pragmatic ties with Communist China. Suhrawardy supported the American-led Southeast Asia Treaty Organization (SEATO) and the Central Treaty Organization (CENTO). He was not keen on nonalignment which was strongly pursued by neighboring India. Suhrawardy toured the United States, was hosted by President Eisenhower at the White House, and met with American movie stars in Hollywood. In domestic policy, Suhrawardy addressed issues of nuclear energy, foreign aid utilization, food policy, the One Unit framework, and building up the military. His staunchly pro-Western foreign policy was opposed by Bengali radicals led by Maulana Bhashani who caused a split in the Awami League. However, Suhrawardy was elected as President of the Awami League. His cabinet included Feroz Khan Noon and Abul Mansur Ahmed among others.

One Unit
Initially promising to review the One Unit framework in the 1956 constitution, Prime Minister Suhrwardy later backtracked. At the National Assembly, Prime Minister Suhrawardy faced pressure from provincialists over the One Unit. West Pakistani provincialists wanted to restore the previous four provinces of Sind, Balochistan, Punjab and the North West Frontier Province. Large rallies were held in West Pakistan against the One Unit. Prime Minister Suhrawardy, however, did not pay attention to the issue. While East Pakistanis also objected to the One Unit for renaming East Bengal as East Pakistan, opposition among ethnic groups to the One Unit was stronger in West Pakistan.

Joint electorate
Suhrawardy's one-year tenure was unable to introduce the joint electorate. Since 1932, elections in Pakistan's provinces were held under the "separate electorate" system of dividing seats in parliament among religious groups in accordance with the colonial-era Communal Award. Abolishing the joint electorate was a key demand of the Awami League.
At the National Assembly, the Awami League initiated constitutional reforms to restore the joint electorate system but faced opposition from the Muslim League.

Nuclear energy

Suhrawardy established the Pakistan Atomic Energy Commission (PAEC). He appointed Dr. Nazir Ahmad as its chairman. Suhrawardy supported the Atoms for Peace initiative. Suhrawardy also released funds to import a nuclear swimming pool reactor from America in 1956.

Economic policy and foreign aid

In 1956, Prime Minister Suhrawardy halted the National Finance Commission (NFC) programme to allocate taxed revenue equally between East and West Pakistan. Suhrawardy relied heavily upon U.S. aid to the country to meet food shortages, and asked the U.S. president to ship wheat flour and rice on a regular basis to Pakistan. In East Pakistan, there were reports of another widespread famine, in which, wheat, potatoes, and rice were being sent from the U.S. and West Pakistan's Fauji Foundation to East Pakistan on a regular basis.

The central government led by Suhrawardy focused on the implementation of the planned economy. His relations with the stock exchange and the business community deteriorated when he announced distribution of the US$10 million ICA aid between West and East, and establishing the shipping corporation at the expense of West Pakistan's revenues. Massive labour strikes broke out in West Pakistan against his economic policy in major cities of Pakistan. Eventually leaders of the stock exchange met with President Mirza to address their concerns and issues.

Foreign policy
Suhrawardy coined the phrase friendship to all, malice to none which was later adopted as Bangladesh's foreign policy. Suhrawardy is also considered to be one of the pioneers of Pakistan's foreign policy aimed, directed, and set towards excessively supporting the United States and their cause, a policy that was pursued by the successive administrations. On 10 July 1957, Prime Minister Suhrawardy paid an official visit to the United States where he met with President Dwight Eisenhower and accepted his request to lease out an air force base to the United States Air Force that would be in use for the signals intelligence purposes against the Soviet Union. The 1960 U-2 incident severely compromised the national security of Pakistan when Soviet Union eventually discovered the base through interrogating its pilot. In return, the United States distributed ~US$ 2.142 billion in shape of giving the supersonic F-104 Starfighter and M48 Patton tanks and dispatching the assistance group to the Pakistan's military. Suhrawardy's party, the Awami League, split over his signing of the US-Pakistan military pact, with Maulana Bhasani leaving to form the National Awami Party (NAP).

Prime Minister Suhrawardy was invited by the Soviet Union for an informal visit but he declined. In 1956, Prime Minister Suhrawardy became the Pakistan's first Prime Minister to visit China. Suhrawardy's India policy was at times critical. He demanded a fair share of water sharing on transboundary rivers. Suhrawardy visited Afghanistan and pledged to work for regional peace, decolonization and stability. Suhrawardy also visited Japan and felt the East Asian country was model to emulate in development. He addressed a joint sitting of the Philippines Congress during which he expressed support for SEATO and continued to call for decolonization.

Resignation
Suhrawardy's short-lived premiership came to an end when he resigned under pressure from President Iskander Mirza in 1957.

Post-coup life
Suhrawardy was arrested by the martial law government after the 1958 military coup in Pakistan. While in jail, he wrote to his niece Salma Sobhan on the occasion of her wedding to Rehman Sobhan, calling Salma "preternaturally transcendentally intelligent".

Criticism

Suhrawardy is often subjected to criticism by in India for failing to prevent the Direct Action Day riots. According to them, Suhrawardy and other Muslim League leaders reportedly delivered provocative speeches reminding the Bengali Muslims of the historical Islamic victory and urged them to follow the same way on 16 August. The historian Devendra Panigrahi, in his book India's Partition: The Story of Imperialism in Retreat, quotes from 13 August 1946 issue of Muslim League mouthpiece The Star of India, "Muslims must remember that ... it was in Ramazan that the permission for jehad was granted by Allah. It was in Ramazan that the Battle of Badr, the first open conflict between Islam and Heathenism, was fought and won by 313 Muslims and again it was in Ramazan that 10,000 Muslims under the Holy Prophet conquered Mecca and established the kingdom of Heaven and the commonwealth of Islam in Arabia. The Muslim League is fortunate that it is starting its action in this holy month". On 16 August 1946, the massive bloody riots erupted in Calcutta, killings scores of Hindus at the hands of rioters. However, there is no other claim or evidence have been found. Suhrawardy attempted to control the situation by unsuccessfully calling for peace and deployment of the Indian Army in Calcutta with no success. The riots ended with thousand deaths and the Indian press blaming Suhrawardy of obstructing the police work, which is well documented by several authors and eyewitnesses. According to authorities, the riots were instigated by members of the Muslim League and its affiliate Volunteer Corps after listening to the speeches made by Khwaja Nazimuddin and Suhrawardy, in the city in order to enforce the declaration by the Muslim League that Muslims were to 'suspend all business' to support their demand for an independent Pakistan. However, supporters of the Muslim League believed that the Congress Party was behind the violence in an effort to weaken the fragile Muslim League government in Bengal, further generating the controversy about the real culprits. Historian Joya Chatterji allocates much of the responsibility to Suhrawardy, for setting up the confrontation and failing to stop the rioting, but points out that Hindu leaders were also culpable. A senior intelligence operative wrote to a senior British officer based at Fort William after the 'Great Calcutta Killings' after the Calcutta riots: "There is hardly a person in Calcutta who has a good word for Suhrawardy, respectable Muslims included. For years he has been known as "The king of the goondas" and my own private opinion is that he fully anticipated what was going to happen, and allowed it to work itself up, and probably organised the disturbance with his goonda gangs as this type of individual has to receive compensation every now and again." According to Tathagata Roy, Suhrawardy had pre-planned the riot long back, evident from the fact that demographic changes were being made in the Calcutta Police constabulary. A Bangladeshi historian Harun-or-Rashid, in his book The Foreshadowing of Bangladesh: Bengal Muslim League & Muslim Politics: 1906–1947, was also critical of Suhrawardy. Recently, Polish scholar Tomasz Flasiński expressed another opinion about Suhrawardy. His research proved, inter alia, that Suhrawardy's famous speech during the first day of Calcutta Riot urged Muslims to come back to their homes instead of (as it was often suggested) encouraging them to riot, and in fact the Prime Minister asked the British army to intervene against hooligans even before that speech. Making use of recently disclosed or hitherto unused sources, he also revealed that Suhrawardy was at odds with Muslim League's radical fraction also after Noakhali riots; however, in some other cases of the Hindu-Muslim armed fights (primarily in Calcutta during Spring 1947) he did less to stop the acts of violence than he could, what made him - according to Flasiński - guilty by negligence.

Death

Suhrawardy died in Beirut, Lebanon in 1963 due to a heart attack. Many Bengalis were - and some still are - convinced that he was killed on Ayub Khan's order, as his popularity may have made him a powerful rival to Ayub in the upcoming presidential elections. He was buried in Dhaka beside Sir Khawaja Nazimuddin and A. K. Fazlul Huq, signifying his towering stature in Bengali politics as one of the three leading Bengali statesmen of the early 20th century.

Legacy
 Suhrawardy Udyan, a historic maidan in Dhaka (formerly the Ramna Race Course).
 Shaheed Suhrawardy Medical College Hospital, a major government hospital in Dhaka, Bangladesh.
 Government Shaheed Suhrawardy College, a public college, located in Dhaka, Bangladesh.
 Government Huseyn Shaheed Suhrawardy College, a government college in Magura, Bangladesh
 Khayaban-e-Suhrawardy (lit. Garden of Suhrawardy), is one of the main thoroughfares of the Pakistani capital of Islamabad.
 Huseyn Shaheed Suhrawardy Hall(East Pakistan Agricultural University, now Bangladesh Agricultural University)
 In 2004, Suhrawardy was ranked number 19 in the BBC's poll of the Greatest Bengali of all time.

See also
 Bengali nationalism in Pakistan
 Conservatism in Pakistan
 Bengali culture in Pakistan
 American lobby in Pakistan
 Pakistan–United States relations

References

Further reading
 Huseyn Shaheed Suhrawardy: A Biography by Begum Shaista Ikramullah (Oxford University Press, 1991)
 Freedom at Midnight by Dominique Lapierre and Larry Collins
 Gandhi's Passion by Stanley Wolpert (Oxford University Press)
 The Last Guardian: Memoirs of Hatch-Barnwell, ICS of Bengal by Stephen Hatch-Barnwell (University Press Limited, 2012)

External links

 
 Prime Minister Huseyn Shaheed Suhrawardy of Pakistan on Face the Nation, 14 July 1957
 The Complete Politician, an article published in Time on Suhrawardy on 24 September 1956
 Suhrawardy Becomes Prime Minister
 Chronicles Of Pakistan
 Glimpses on Suhrawardy, an article published on The Daily Star on 23 June 2009
 Suhrawardy meets Eisenhower , video footage from British Pathé
 Speech by Suhrawardy on Kashmir , video footage from British Pathé
 Commonwealth Ministers at No 10 , video footage from British Pathé

|-

1892 births
1963 deaths
Bengali Muslims
University of Calcutta alumni
Bengali lawyers
All India Muslim League members
Politicians from Kolkata
Controversies in India
Pakistan Movement activists from Bengal
Leaders of the Pakistan Movement
Huseyn Shaheed
Pakistani people of Bengali descent
Pakistani people of Arab descent
Pakistan Muslim League politicians
Law Ministers of Pakistan
Pakistani MNAs 1947–1954
Awami League politicians
People of East Pakistan
Pakistani MNAs 1955–1958
Prime Ministers of Pakistan
Defence Ministers of Pakistan
Pakistani anti-communists
Anti-Soviet resistance
Pakistani nationalists
Conservatism in Pakistan
People of the insurgency in Balochistan
Pakistani exiles
People from Karachi
Presidents of the Awami League
Aliah University alumni
20th-century Indian lawyers
20th-century Bengalis
20th-century Muslims
Bengal MLAs 1937–1945
Members of the Constituent Assembly of Pakistan